The West Virginia Midland Railroad was chartered in 1905 with initial capital of $500,000. Incorporators were Col. John T. McGraw of Grafton, former Congressman C. P. Dorr, J.E. Woddell of Webster Springs, G. A. Hechner of Palmer, and C. D. Elliott of Parkersburg.

References

Defunct West Virginia railroads